The R.H. Farwell House is an historic double house at 2222–2224 Massachusetts Avenue in Cambridge, Massachusetts.

Description and history 
The wood-frame house was built in 1891, at a time when what is now Massachusetts Avenue (then North Avenue) was lined with prestigious and fashionable houses. The house has matching center entries under a hip roof, flanked by a pair of two story polygonal bays, which once had brackets in the eaves (since removed). A pair of gabled dormers pierce the roof, space symmetrically near the outer edges.

The house was listed on the National Register of Historic Places in 1982.

See also
National Register of Historic Places listings in Cambridge, Massachusetts

References

Houses on the National Register of Historic Places in Cambridge, Massachusetts
Houses completed in 1891
Queen Anne architecture in Massachusetts